Alexandros Kalpogiannakis (born 29 April 2002) is a Greek sailor. He won two silver medals at the 2018 World U21 Sailing Championships and one gold medal at the 2018 European U21 Sailing Championships representing Greece. He also won a gold medal for Greece, at the 2018 Summer Youth Olympics.

References

External links
 
 

2002 births
Living people
Greek male sailors (sport)
Youth Olympic gold medalists for Greece
Sailors at the 2018 Summer Youth Olympics